Amarpur may refer to:
 Kharghana, a town in Bihar state, India
 Amarpur, Bihar Assembly constituency state assembly constituency centered around the town
 Amarpur, Tripura, a town in Tripura state, India
 Amarpur, Tripura Assembly constituency state assembly constituency centered around the town
 Amarpura Jatan, a village in Rajasthan, India
 Amarpur, Nepal